Asociația Clubul Sportiv Olimpic Cetate Râșnov, commonly known as Olimpic Cetate Râțnov or Cetate Râșnov, is a Romanian football club based in Râșnov, Brașov County, currently playing in Liga III.

History
Olimpic Cetate Râșnov was founded in 1930 as FC Râșnov and played for all its history at Liga IV until 2016. In 2007 the club was reorganized and missed a promotion to Liga III at the end of the 2012–13 season. At the end of the 2015–16 Liga IV season, the team from Râșnov was crowned champions of Brașov County and went to the promotion play-off match. After a tough play-off against Unirea Cristuru Secuiesc, Olimpic won on aggregate and promoted to Liga III.

At the end of the 2016–17 Liga III season, the first season for the club at Liga III, Galben-Albaștrii finished in 7th place.

Honours

Domestic

Leagues
Liga IV – Brașov County
Winners (2): 2012–13, 2015–16

Cups
Cupa României – Brașov County
Runners-up (1): 2013–14

Players

First team squad

Out on loan

Club officials

Board of directors

Current technical staff

League history

References

External links
 Official website
 

Association football clubs established in 1930
Football clubs in Brașov County
Liga III clubs
Liga IV clubs
1930 establishments in Romania
Râșnov